The West of Scotland Amateur Football League (WoSAFL) was a football league competition, primarily for amateur clubs in the west of Scotland.  It was formed in 1898 and claimed to be the oldest amateur league in world football.  The association was affiliated to the Scottish Amateur Football Association.

As a stand-alone Association and not part of Scotland's pyramid system, the Premier Division did not act as a feeder league.

With reducing membership, the league folded after the 2016–17 season.

Member Clubs

As of the final season in 2016–17, the West of Scotland AFL contained seven member clubs in a single division.

 Bellaire
 Cardross
 Carradale
 Helensburgh
 Newshot
 South Lochaber Thistle
 United Glasgow

References

External links
Website of the West of Scotland AFL
Website of the Scottish Amateur FA

Defunct football leagues in Scotland
1898 establishments in Scotland
2017 disestablishments in Scotland
Amateur association football in Scotland
Sports leagues established in 1898
Sports leagues disestablished in 2017